Williams Mullen is a regionally based, full-service law firm with more than 240 attorneys in offices across North Carolina, South Carolina and Virginia. The firm began in 1909. Williams Mullen is the third largest firm in Virginia based on attorney headcount according to Virginia Business magazine.

Practice areas
Williams Mullen is a full-service corporate law firm with a significant state and federal government relations practice.  Its practice groups include corporate law, litigation, finance and real estate. In addition, the firm offers more specialized practices, including employee benefits & executive compensation,  environmental law, intellectual property, government contracts, government relations, health care, intellectual property, labor & employment, tax law and white collar & investigations.

References

External links 
 National Law Review profile
 Chambers USA profile
 Profile on Martindale.com

Law firms established in 1909
Law firms based in Richmond, Virginia
Lobbying firms